Manikchak is a village in the Manikchak CD block in the Malda Sadar subdivision of Malda district in the state of West Bengal, India.

Geography

Location
Manikchak is located at

Area overview
The area shown in the adjoining map is the physiographic sub-region known as the diara. It “is a relatively well drained flat land formed by the fluvial deposition of newer alluvium.” The most note-worthy feature is the Farakka Barrage across the Ganges. The area is a part of the Malda Sadar subdivision, which is an overwhelmingly rural region, but the area shown in the map has pockets of urbanization with 17 census towns, concentrated mostly in the Kaliachak I CD block. The bank of the Ganges between Bhutni and Panchanandapur (both the places are marked on the map), is the area worst hit  by left bank erosion, a major problem in the Malda area. The ruins of Gauda, capital of several empires, is located in this area.

Note: The map alongside presents some of the notable locations in the area. All places marked in the map are linked in the larger full screen map.

Civic administration

Police station
Manikchak police station under West Bengal police has jurisdiction over Manikchak CD block.

CD block HQ
The headquarters of Manikchak CD block is at Manikchak.

Demographics
According to the 2011 Census of India, Manikchak had a total population of 4,038, of which 2,103 (52%) were males and 1,935 (48%) were females. Population in the age range 0–6 years was 700. The total number of literate persons in Manikchak was 2,181 (65.34% of the population over 6 years).

Transport
State Highway 10 connects Manickchak to National Highway 12 (old number NH 34) at Malda and National Highway 131A at Ratua.

There is a private ferry service operating between Manikchak ferry ghat and Sahibganj ferry ghat, across the Ganges,  in Jharkhand. Around 15,000 to 20,000 people use the ferry on weekdays.

Education
Manikchak College at Mathurapur, established in 2014, is affiliated to the University of Gour Banga. It offers an honours course in Bengali and a general course in arts.

Healthcare
Manikchak Rural Hospital at Manikchak with 30 beds is the main medical facility in Manikchak CD Block. There are primary health centres at Bhutni (with 10 beds), Mathurapur (with 4 beds) and Nurpur (with 4 beds).

External links

References

Villages in Malda district